Jon Bentley may refer to:

 Jon Bentley (computer scientist) (born 1953), American computer scientist
 Jon Bentley (TV presenter) (born 1961), English television presenter

See also
John Bentley (disambiguation)